100.5 Radyo Natin (DXBD 100.5 MHz) is an FM station in the Philippines owned and operated by Manila Broadcasting Company. Its studios and transmitter are located at the 5th floor, Nursing Bldg., DMC College Foundation Campus, Brgy. Sta. Filomena, Dipolog.

References

External links
Radyo Natin Dipolog FB Page

Radio stations established in 2002
Radio stations in Zamboanga del Norte